Plein or het Plein is a town square in the old city centre of The Hague in the Netherlands.

It is located adjacent to the Binnenhof, the meeting place of the States General of the Netherlands; the entrance to the House of Representatives can be found on Plein 2. The Mauritshuis art museum is located on Plein 29.

Plein was originally a garden, forming a part of the Binnenhof castle, residence of the Counts of Holland. It was used to grow vegetables for the court. The garden was surrounded by a ring of canals and intersected by ditches. As a town square, Plein was constructed in 1632 and was inspired by the Place des Vosges in Paris.

A statue of William the Silent, made by Dutch sculptor Lodewyk Royer, was installed in the centre of the square in 1848.

References

External links
 
  (in Dutch)

Squares in The Hague
Tourist attractions in South Holland